Jean III d'Aa, lord of Gruuthuse  (Jan III van Gruuthuse en van der Aa, sieur de Gruuthuse; born about 1368/69, died before 1420) was a Flemish-Burgundian knight of the Bruges noble family of Gruuthuse. He is notable for having fought a great tournament in Bruges on 11 March 1393 against his cousin, Jean (Wulfart) de Ghistelle, lord of Gistel and Harnes. Jean was also the grandfather of Louis de Gruuthuse, himself a "bulwark of Burgundian chivalry" and  a notable participant in tournaments in the 1440s.

The tournament took place on the Groote Markt (great market square) of Bruges.
Jean de Gruuthuse was the challenger and fought with 49 companions; Jean de  
Ghistelles was defendant, with 48 companions, for a total of 99 combatants.
Most of the participants were from the town patriciate. There are several extant copies of full lists of participants with their coats of arms, often appended to copies of King René's Tournament Book, which work of the 1460s was substantially influenced by the Bruges tournament of 1393.

References

Jean-Marie van den Eeckhout, Het Tornooi van Brugge van Dinsdag 11 Maart 1393. Vlaamse Stam, 2010, 46/5:377-406. 
Octave Delepierre,  Précis des annales de Bruges (1835) 38f

See also 

 Louis of Gruuthuse
 House of Gruuthuse
Jacob van Brugge
 Josse van Aertrycke

External links
Steen Clemmensen (ed.), Tournament in Bruges held 11 March 1393 led by Jean d'Aa Sr. de Gruuthuse and Jean de Ghistelles Sr. de Gistel & Harnes (2010)

Nobility from Bruges
Medieval knights
Medieval tournament